Gráinne Conole was Professor of Learning Innovation and Director of the Institute of Learning Innovation, University of Leicester. Prior to this, she was Professor of eLearning at the Institute of Educational Technology in the UK's Open University.  Previously she had a chair in education at the University of Southampton and was also previously director of the Institute for Learning and Research Technology at the University of Bristol. Professor Conole was named an EDEN Fellow in 2013 and was awarded a National Teaching Fellowship from the Higher Education Academy  and ASCILITE Fellow Award in 2012.

Born in Ireland, Professor Conole later moved to London.  She has two children, Eleanor and Tabitha.

See also

 Gráinne (given name)

References

External links
 Gráinne Conole biography on the web site of the Association for Learning Technology's 2003 conference

Irish scholars and academics
Academics of the University of Southampton
Academics of the Open University
1964 births
Living people
Academics of the University of Leicester